The Battle of Mansurah was fought from 8 to 11 February 1250, between Crusaders led by Louis IX, King of France, and Ayyubid forces led by Sultana Shajar al-Durr, vizier Fakhr ad-Din ibn as-Shaikh, Faris ad-Din Aktai and Baibars al-Bunduqdari. It was fought in present-day Mansoura, Egypt.  The Crusader force was enticed into entering the town where it was set upon by the Muslim force.  The Crusaders withdrew in disorder to their encampment where they were besieged by the Muslims. The Crusaders broke-out and withdrew to Damietta in early April.

Background
By the mid-13th century, the Crusaders became convinced that Egypt, the heart of Islam's forces and arsenal, was an obstacle to their ambition to capture Jerusalem, which they had lost for the second time in 1244. In 1245, during the First Council of Lyon, Pope Innocent IV gave his full support to the Seventh Crusade being prepared by Louis IX, King of France.

The goals of the Seventh Crusade were to destroy the Ayyubid dynasty in Egypt and Syria, and to recapture Jerusalem.  The Crusaders asked the Mongols to become their allies against the Muslims, the Crusaders attacking the Islamic world from west, and the Mongols attacking from the east. Güyük, the Great Khan of the Mongols, told the Pope's envoy that the Pope and the kings of Europe should submit to the Mongols.

The ships of the Seventh Crusade, led by King Louis's brothers, Charles d'Anjou and Robert d'Artois, sailed from Aigues-Mortes and Marseille to Cyprus during the autumn of 1248, and then on to Egypt. The ships entered Egyptian waters and the troops of the Seventh Crusade disembarked at Damietta in June 1249. Louis IX sent a letter to as-Salih Ayyub. Emir Fakhr ad-Din Yusuf, the commander of the Ayyubid garrison in Damietta, retreated to the camp of the Sultan in Ashmum-Tanah, causing a great panic among the inhabitants of Damietta, who fled the town, leaving the bridge that connected the west bank of the Nile with Damietta intact. The Crusaders crossed over the bridge and occupied Damietta, which was deserted. The fall of Damietta caused a general emergency (called al-Nafir al-Am النفير العام) to be declared, and locals from Cairo and from all over Egypt moved to the battle zone.  For many weeks, the Muslims used guerrilla tactics against the Crusader camps; many of the Crusaders were captured and sent to Cairo. As the Crusader army was strengthened by the arrival of Alphonse de Poitiers, the third brother of King Louis IX, at Damietta, the Crusaders were encouraged by the news of the death of the Ayyubid Sultan, as-Salih Ayyub. The Crusaders began their march towards Cairo. Shajar al-Durr, the widow of the dead Sultan, concealed the news for some time and sent Faris ad-Din Aktai to Hasankeyf to recall Turanshah, the son and heir, to ascend the throne and lead the Egyptian army.

Battle
The Crusaders approached the battle by the canal of Ashmum (known today by the name Albahr Alsaghir), which separated them from the Muslim camp. An Egyptian showed the Crusaders the way to the canal shoals.  The Crusaders, led by Robert of Artois, crossed the canal with the Knights Templar and an English contingent led by William of Salisbury, launching a surprise assault on the Egyptian camp in Gideila, two miles (3 km) from al-Mansurah, and advancing toward the royal palace in al-Mansurah. The leadership of the Egyptian forces passed to the Mamluks Faris Ad-Din Aktai and Baibars al-Buduqdari who contained the attack and reorganized the Muslim forces. This was the first appearance of the Mamluks as supreme commanders inside Egypt.  Shajar al-Durr, who had full control of Egypt, agreed with Baibars' plan to defend al-Mansurah.  Baibars ordered the  gate be opened to let the Crusaders enter the town. The crusaders rushed in, thinking the town deserted, only to find themselves trapped inside. The Crusaders were besieged from all directions by Egyptian forces and the local population, and they took heavy losses. Robert of Artois, who took refuge in a house, and William of Salisbury were both killed along with most of the Knights Templar. Only five Templar Knights escaped alive. The Crusaders retreated to their camp in disorder, and surrounded it with a ditch and wall.

Aftermath

King Louis IX tried to negotiate with the Egyptians, offering the surrender of the Egyptian port of Damietta in exchange for Jerusalem and a few towns on the Syrian coast. The Egyptians rejected the offer, and the Crusaders, struck by disease, retreated to Damietta on April 5, followed closely by the Muslim forces. At the subsequent Battle of Fariskur, the last major battle of the Seventh Crusade, the Crusader forces were annihilated and King Louis IX was captured on April 6. Meanwhile, the Crusaders were circulating false information in Europe, claiming that King Louis IX defeated the Sultan of Egypt in a great battle, and Cairo had been betrayed into Louis's hands.  Later, when the news of Louis IX's capture and the French defeat reached France, the Shepherds' Crusade movement occurred in France.

See also
Battle of Mansurah (1221)
Berke–Hulagu war

Notes

References

Abu al-Fida, Tarikh Abu al-Fida, The Concise History of Humanity
Al-Maqrizi, Al Selouk Leme'refatt Dewall al-Melouk, Dar al-kotob, 1997. In English: Bohn, Henry G., The Road to Knowledge of the Return of Kings, Chronicles of the Crusades, AMS Press, 1969.
Al-Maqrizi, al-Mawaiz wa al-'i'tibar bi dhikr al-khitat wa al-'athar, Matabat aladab, Cairo 1996, . In French: Bouriant, Urbain, Description topographique et historique de l'Egypte, Paris 1895
Asly, B., al-Muzafar Qutuz, Dar An-Nafaes Publishing, Beirut 2002, 
Bournoutian, George A., A Concise History of the Armenian People: From Ancient Times to the Present, Mazda Publishers, 2002
David Wilkinson, Studying the History of Intercivilizational Dialogues, presented to United Nation University, Tokyo/Kyoto 2001
Dawson, Christopher, The Mongol Mission, London: Sheed and Ward, 1955
Hassan. O, Al-Zahir Baibars, Dar al-Amal 1997
Ibn Taghri, al-Nujum al-Zahirah Fi Milook Misr wa al-Qahirah, al-Hay'ah al-Misreyah 1968
Michaud, Yahia (Oxford Centre for Islamic Studies) Ibn Taymiyya, Textes Spirituels I-XVI 2002
Qasim, Abdu Qasim Dr., Asr Salatin Al-Mamlik (Era of the Mamluk Sultans), Eye for human and social studies, Cairo, 2007
Rachewitz, I, Papal envoys to the Great khans, London: Faber and Faber, 1971
Runciman, Steven A history of the Crusades 3. Penguin Books, 1987
Sadawi. H, Al-Mamalik, Maroof Ikhwan, Alexandria.

Skip Knox, Dr. E.L., The Crusades, Seventh Crusade, A college course on the Crusades, 1999
Shayal, Jamal, Prof. of Islamic history, Tarikh Misr al-isalamiyah (History of Islamic Egypt), dar al-Maref, Cairo 1266,  
The chronicles of Matthew Paris (Matthew Paris: Chronica Majora) translated by Helen Nicholson, 1989
Matthæi Parisiensis, monachi Sancti Albani, Chronica majora by Matthew Paris, Roger, Henry Richards, Longman & co. 1880.
The New Encyclopædia Britannica, Macropædia, H. H. Berton Publisher, 1973–74
The Memoirs of the Lord of Joinville, translated by Ethel Wedgwood, 1906
Toynbee, Arnold J., Mankind and mother earth, Oxford University Press, 1976

External links
Map of Mansura

Conflicts in 1250
Mansurah
Mansurah
Mansurah
1250
Mansurah
13th century in the Ayyubid Sultanate
Mansoura, Egypt